Mount Pleasant is a mountain located in the Catskill Mountains of New York state, USA, northwest of Olivebridge. Cross Mountain is located southwest and Romer Mountain is located north-northwest of Mount Pleasant.

References

Mountains of Ulster County, New York
Mountains of New York (state)